Terrace End railway station was a station on the North Island Main Trunk in New Zealand. The station served the northern suburb of Terrace End in Palmerston North. The station was located adjacent to a gravel pit owned by the Railways Department for ballast production.

The station was opened in 1879, and closed on 21 October 1960. The station was demolished and railway removed in the early 1960s.

The station was damaged when a large storm blew through the city in 1936.

References

Defunct railway stations in New Zealand
Buildings and structures in Manawatū-Whanganui
Railway stations opened in 1879
Railway stations closed in 1960
Rail transport in Manawatū-Whanganui
1879 establishments in New Zealand
1960 disestablishments in New Zealand